The Death Row Sessions EP is an unofficial bootleg EP/Compilation album by rapper/record producer DJ Quik (as David Blake), released in 2008.

The album contains unreleased material and recordings by DJ Quik.

Track listing
 "Intro" - DJ Quik
 "Boom" - DJ Quik
 "What That Is" - Baby Eagle feat. DJ Quik
 "Bringing the Funk (Remix) (Instrumental)" - Str8-G
 "Words to My First Born" - 2Pac feat. Nutt-So
 "Loked out Hood (Live G-Funk Remix)" - DJ Quik
 "Let's Get Down (Death Row Remix)" - Tony! Toni! Tone! feat. DJ Quik
 "Dollaz & Sense (Instrumental)" - DJ Quik
 "Late Night" 2Pac feat. AMG & DJ Quik
 "4 Or 5 for Danny Boy" - Suge Knight Interview
 "Doggy Style (Live Version)" - DJ Roger with DJ Quik
 "Dollaz & Sense (Demo)" - DJ Quik feat. 2nd II None
 "Somethin' 4 tha Mood (Instrumental)" - DJ Quik
 "Heartz of Men (Retail Demo)" - 2Pac

References

2008 EPs
DJ Quik albums
Albums produced by DJ Quik
Death Row Records EPs